Roop Singh Bais (8 September 1908 – 16 December 1977) was an Indian hockey player. He was part of the Indian field hockey team, which won gold medals for India at the 1932 and 1936 Olympic Games. He was the younger brother of Dhyan Chand.

Career
Singh is best known for his sports career, during which he scored three goals against Japan and ten goals against the USA in the Los Angeles Summer Olympics 1932. He was in the armed forces.

Personal life
Singh was the younger brother of Dhyan Chand. Playing for India, and he won the gold medal in the 1932 and 1936 Olympic Games.

Singh's Bais Rajput family was based in Gwalior, Madhya Pradesh. His son, Bhagat Singh, played Hockey for India, and his grandson Uday Singh also played Hockey. His father, Subedar Sameshwar Dutt Singh was in the army.

Recognition
The Captain Roop Singh Stadium in Gwalior, named after Singh, was originally a hockey stadium before it was converted into a cricket venue in 1988. The German Olympic Committee sent Singh a map showing a street in Munich bearing his name following his impressive performance at the 1936 Olympics. He was also among the only three Indian players, the others being Dhyan Chand and Leslie Claudius to have the tube stations in London renamed in the run-up to the 2012 Summer Olympics.

References

External links
 
 Profile at Sports Reference
 Profile at databaseOlympics.com

1908 births
1977 deaths
Olympic field hockey players of India
Field hockey players at the 1932 Summer Olympics
Field hockey players at the 1936 Summer Olympics
Indian male field hockey players
Olympic gold medalists for India
Field hockey players from Madhya Pradesh
Olympic medalists in field hockey
People from Jabalpur
Medalists at the 1936 Summer Olympics
Medalists at the 1932 Summer Olympics